Callitriche truncata, the short leaved water starwort, is a species of plant in the family Plantaginaceae. They have a self-supporting growth form and simple, broad leaves. Individuals can grow to 10 cm tall.

Sources

References 

truncata
Flora of Malta